Ruthven railway station is located on the Mernda line in Victoria, Australia. It serves the northern Melbourne suburb of Reservoir, and it opened on 5 August 1963.

History

Ruthven station opened on 5 August 1963, and was named after William Ruthven, who served in both world wars (winning the Victoria Cross in World War I), and was later a member of the Victorian Parliament, representing Preston and then Reservoir. A ceremony occurred a day earlier to celebrate the opening, with dignitaries who attended the opening including then Transport Minister Edward Meagher, and then opposition leader in the Victorian Legislative Council, John Galbally. When it opened, the station building was painted in a bright red colour.

In 2022, Ruthven received a $1.03 million upgrade, as part of the Victoria's Big Build project. Upgrades to the station included improved lighting and facilities, new signage and a substation constructed opposite Platform 1.

Platforms and services

Ruthven has one island platform with two faces. It is serviced by Metro Trains' Mernda line services.

Platform 1:
  all stations and limited express services to Flinders Street

Platform 2:
  all stations services to Mernda

Transport links

Dysons operates one route via Ruthven station, under contract to Public Transport Victoria:
 : Pacific Epping – Northland Shopping Centre

References

External links
 Melway map at street-directory.com.au

Railway stations in Melbourne
Railway stations in Australia opened in 1963
Railway stations in the City of Darebin